Ruskin College, originally known as Ruskin Hall, Oxford, is an independent educational institution in Oxford, England. It is not a college of Oxford University. It is named after the essayist, art and social critic John Ruskin (1819–1900) and specialises in providing educational opportunities for adults with few or no qualifications.  Degrees taught at Ruskin were awarded by the Open University. The college planned to merge with Activate Learning from July 2021, but instead was acquired by the University of West London during August 2021.

Mission and purpose 

The mission of the college has always been to provide educational opportunities to adults who are excluded and disadvantaged, and to transform the individuals concerned along with the communities, groups and societies from which they come, the only change having been to personalise the language (away from 'the excluded', who do not sound like people) in line with growing equalities awareness. The mission statement is twofold:

 The first aim, that of giving individuals a second chance in education, continues to be achieved by admitting those with few or no formal qualifications to courses of study that can result in, or lead on to, university-level qualifications.
 The second aim, the transformational element of the mission, is evidenced by the fact that the most frequent thing former students say about Ruskin is that it changed their lives. Students, whether or not they themselves are resident, benefit from studying in a setting with a strong sense of academic community and from the intensive tutorial teaching that Ruskin offers. The college is also transformational because it sees education as a vehicle for progressive social change.

Ruskin tends towards a curriculum that has high social relevance, students who want to make a difference in the world, and forms of academic scholarship and research that are engaged and applied.

Ruskin's mission is also pursued by means of strong historical links, nationally and internationally, with the labour and trade union movement, other social movements and activism around social issues (e.g., anti-ageism), as well as with local communities, for example through the Social Work and Youth and Community work programmes.

History 

Ruskin College – originally known as Ruskin Hall, Oxford – was established in 1899 specifically to provide educational opportunities for working-class men, who were denied access to university. It was deliberately placed in Oxford, the city in which its young American founders, Charles A. Beard; James Alfred Dale MA (Oxon) (1875-1951), lecturer at Merton College, Oxford and later Professor of McGill and Toronto universities in Canada; and Walter Vrooman, had studied, because the city symbolised the educational privilege and standards to which ordinary people could never previously have aspired. It was Walter Vrooman's then wife, Amne (later Amne Grafflin), who financially supported the foundation of the college.

The school was envisioned as a mechanism by which "working-class reformers" could "educate themselves efficiently at nominal cost." Tuition, lodging, and board was priced at 12s 6d (£0.625)) per week, with a parallel correspondence course alternatively offered for 1 shilling (£0.05) per week plus a 1 shilling entrance fee. Courses were offered in political economy, sociology, the history of the labour movement, principles of politics, English literature, psychology, and other related aspects of the social sciences.

The school was administered by a General Council, which included elected representatives from the Parliamentary Committee of the Trades Union Congress and the Central Board of the Cooperative Union. An auxiliary organisation of supporters of the school was launched in 1901, the Ruskin Hall Educational League, which arranged conferences and public lectures in conjunction with the activities of the school.

During World War I, some of the two hundred Belgian refugees who came to Oxford were lodged in the college.

Ruskin College became, in turn, a symbol of workers' education. It served as a model for labour colleges around the world, and Gandhi made a point of visiting during a brief stay in Oxford in 1931 because he had been so inspired by the writings of John Ruskin on workers' education, just as the college founders had been.

Ruskin College was a secular sister-school to and a model for Plater College until Plater's closing in 2005.

Strike of 1909 

In 1908, a group of Ruskin students, dissatisfied with its education policy which they viewed as too pro-establishment and imbued with elements of "social control", formed the Plebs' League. The students' revolt was supported by the Principal, Dennis Hird, and following his dismissal the students took strike action, refusing to attend lectures.

Post-1945 
In 1970 Ruskin College hosted the UK's first National Women's Liberation Conference. The conference ran from 27 February to 1 March with between 500 and 600 people attending. British newspaper The Guardian called the conference the "biggest landmarks in British women's history". The conference organisers included Ruskin students Arielle Aberson and Sally Alexander, and historian Sheila Rowbotham. The organisers were associated with the History Workshop seminars held at the college and the conference was initially intended to focus on women's history.

Relocation of the college 
A £17m redevelopment programme of the college's Old Headington site was completed in 2012, and the headquarters of the college moved there from the more central original site in Walton Street. The redeveloped site has a new academic building incorporating an expanded library, named the Callaghan Library in honour of former Labour Prime Minister, James Callaghan, who made a major education speech at Ruskin in 1976. The MacColl/Seeger archive has its own dedicated room within the new library. All other buildings on the site have been refurbished, the grounds have been improved and the walled garden, with its listed 'crinkle crankle wall' has been brought back into use by local volunteers. A cafeteria is open to the public.

Around this time, parts of the college's archives were controversially destroyed. The college asserted that it was legally required to dispose of the records because they contained personally identifying information.

Merger 
In February 2021 the College agreed to merge with Activate Learning. In May 2021 the College Principal was suspended. In August 2021 it was announced that the College had been acquired by the University of West London.

College structure 

Student enrolments at Ruskin in 2005–2006 reached their highest ever number in the college's history. Enrolments on long courses were 294 in total across a range of undergraduate and postgraduate programmes. Short course enrolments reached 5,187 in total, including trade union courses, residential short courses and the largest ever Summer School. In 2005–06, there were 78 full-time equivalent academic staff of whom 26 were teaching staff and 13 teaching support services staff.

Progression rates are excellent, with 87% of students on undergraduate-level Humanities courses at Ruskin having come via short courses there, and a majority of students on long courses going on to degree-level study, both at Ruskin and elsewhere. Ruskin students go on to jobs in professional, trade union and political settings, amongst others.

People

Principals 
 1899–1909 James Dennis Hird (1st Principal)
 1909–16 Gilbert Slater
 1916–25 Henry Sanderson Furniss, 1st Baron Sanderson
 1926–44 Alfred Barratt Brown
 1944–50 Herbert Lionel Elvin
 1950–79 Herbert Delauney "Billy" Hughes
 1979–89 John Hughes
 1989–97 Stephen Yeo
 1998–2003 James Durcan
 2004–13 Audrey Mullender
 2014–24 March 2016 Dr Chris Wilkes 
 2016–2021 Paul Di Felice
 2021- Professor Peter John

Former academics/teachers 
 Clement Attlee, Labour Prime Minister (1945–1951)
 Peter Donaldson, economist, author and broadcaster
 Tom Mboya, Kenyan politician
 Bill McCarthy, Lord McCarthy, Labour Party politician
 Raphael Samuel, writer and historian
 Henry Sanderson Furniss, Lord Sanderson (1907–1916)
 David Selbourne (1966–86), writer

Notable alumni 

 Jack Ashley (1922–2012), Baron Ashley of Stoke, Labour Member of Parliament
 Sally Alexander English historian and feminist activist 
 Michael Berry Jr (2011–2013), actor
 Judith Cummins, Labour MP for Bradford South
 Ben Enwonwu, Nigerian artist
 R. M. Fox, author and historian
 Judy Fryd, Founder of Mencap
 John Goss (1894-1953), baritone
 Fred Harrison (born 1944), British author and economist
 Jack Hilton (1900–1983), British novelist, essayist, and travel writer
 Jónas Jónsson, Icelandic educator and politician
 Sasha Johnson (born 1993) British Black Lives Matter activist and member of Taking the Initiative Party
 Roy Hughes, Baron Islwyn (1925 - 2003), former Labour MP for Newport
 Lucy Lameck (1934–1992), Tanzanian politician and Minister
 Tom Mboya (1930–1969), Kenya civil rights hero, Minister of Economic Planning and Development 
 Adams Oshiomhole, former Nigeria Labour Union President; Former Governor of Edo State, Current Chairman of the All Progressives Congress.
 Walter Padley, trade union leader and Labour MP for Ogmore
 John Prescott, Labour former deputy prime minister
 Phil Sawford, former Labour MP for Kettering
 Dennis Skinner, former Labour MP for Bolsover
 Siaka Probyn Stevens, Prime Minister and President of Sierra Leone
 James Walker (1883–1945), trade unionist and Labour politician
 Thomas Edward Williams, 1st Baron Williams, Co-operative and Labour politician
 George Woodcock, general secretary, Trade Union Congress
 William Woodruff, historian and writer.
 Robert Young, trade unionist, Labour Member of Parliament

Ruskin Fellowship 

The Ruskin Fellowship is an alumni association for ex-Ruskin College students and staff. Independent of but associated with the college, the Fellowship aims to support the work and ethos of the college in offering university-level education to disadvantaged adults in Britain. There is also a post graduate programme and an international section involving: International Labour and Trade Union Studies; Webb and Chevening Scholars.

The Ruskin Fellowship was founded in the academic year 1911/1912 and held its first "Annual Meet" on 27 May 1912.  This tradition continues with an Annual Reunion held in September of each year. The Reunion is held over a weekend and incorporates speakers on relevant topics, a social activity including a bar, music and a buffet and, on the Sunday morning of the Reunion weekend, the Fellowship's Annual General Meeting (AGM). The AGM elects an Executive Committee to run the Fellowship for the following 12 months. A history of the Fellowship was produced in 2012 to mark the centenary of the Fellowship's first "Annual Meet".

A pamphlet on The History of the College and the Fellowship During World War One has been published as part of the commemoration of the War.

Students Union 
The Ruskin Students Union is known for its political and social endeavours. In January 2013, it joined a Unite Against Fascism protest at the Oxford Union when the Union invited Nick Griffin, the leader of the British National Party to speak, and it has also given support to the striking nurses in the Karen Reissmann dispute.

Notable former executive members of the RSU include John Prescott and Jack Ashley.

References

External links 
 Ruskin College website
 Ruskin Fellowship
 Historical background
 New Ruskin Archives
 Students Union

 
Educational institutions established in 1899
Education in Oxford
Buildings and structures in Oxford
John Ruskin
Open University
Organisations associated with the University of Oxford
1899 establishments in England